Louis Maigret (or Meigret) was the author of the Traité de la Grammaire française, which was published in 1550. This was the first grammatical description of French.

References 
Malmberg, Bertil. 1991. Histoire de la linguistique, de Summer à Saussure. Paris: Presses Universitaires de France.

Scolar Press issued a facsimile reprint in 1969, R. C. Alston, editor.
https://www.biblio.com/book/trette-grammere-francoeze-reponse-defenses-reponse/d/1162675702?view=1

Linguists from France
Linguists of French
16th-century French writers
16th-century male writers
French male writers